This is a chronological list of every government formed by the prime ministers of Northern Cyprus. A new number is allocated to each new prime minister.

List of prime ministers of Northern Cyprus (1975–present)

Prime ministers of the Turkish Federated State of Cyprus (1975–1983)
This list gives all prime ministers after the founding of the Turkish Federated State of Cyprus, which was intended as an autonomous part of Cyprus, but was rejected by the government of the Republic of Cyprus.

Prime ministers of the Turkish Republic of Northern Cyprus (1983–present)
This list gives all prime ministers after Northern Cyprus' unilateral declaration of independence in 1983, which followed after the refusal of the government of the Republic of Cyprus to recognize the Turkish Federated State of Cyprus.

See also
Prime Minister of Northern Cyprus

Northern Cyprus, List of Prime Ministers of
List
Prime Ministers

pl:Premierzy Cypru Północnego
tr:Kuzey Kıbrıs Türk Cumhuriyeti Başbakanlığı#Başbakanlar listesi